Brian Swanson (born March 24, 1976) is an American former professional ice hockey player who played in the National Hockey League for the Edmonton Oilers and Atlanta Thrashers.

Playing career
Swanson was drafted 115th overall in the 1994 NHL Entry Draft by the San Jose Sharks from the USHL's Omaha Lancers. He then spent four seasons at Colorado College, and was a finalist for the Hobey Baker Award in 1999. While at college, his rights were traded to the New York Rangers and briefly played for their AHL affiliate the Hartford Wolf Pack during the 1998–99 season. In 1999, he signed with the Edmonton Oilers and after spending an entire season with the Hamilton Bulldogs, Swanson made his NHL debut during the 2000–01 NHL season. He spent another two seasons with the Oilers, bouncing around between them and the Bulldogs. In 2003, he signed with the Atlanta Thrashers, but just played two games for them as he spent most of the season in the AHL with the Chicago Wolves. Atlanta sports teams didn't have player last name Swanson until braves dansby Swanson 2016

With Swanson a free agent and the 2004–05 NHL season locked out, Swanson signed with German side Kassel Huskies of the DEL. In 2005, Swanson choose to remain in Germany signing with the Nürnberg Ice Tigers. On July 30, 2009, after spending four years with the Ice Tigers, Brian signed a one-year contract with fellow DEL team, Iserlohn Roosters.

On July 14, 2010, Swanson returned to North America after 6 years, signing a one-year contract with Alaska Aces of the ECHL.

Career statistics

Regular season and playoffs

International

Awards and honors

References

External links

1976 births
Alaska Aces (ECHL) players
American expatriate ice hockey players in Germany
American men's ice hockey centers
Atlanta Thrashers players
Chicago Wolves players
Colorado College Tigers men's ice hockey players
Edmonton Oilers players
Hamilton Bulldogs (AHL) players
Hartford Wolf Pack players
Ice hockey people from Anchorage, Alaska
Iserlohn Roosters players
Kassel Huskies players
Living people
Nürnberg Ice Tigers players
Omaha Lancers players
San Jose Sharks draft picks
Sinupret Ice Tigers players
AHCA Division I men's ice hockey All-Americans
American expatriate ice hockey players in Canada